David R. Hart (May 24, 1925 – March 14, 2009) was an American football player, coach, and college athletics administrator. He served as the head football coach at the University of Pittsburgh from 1966 to 1968, compiling a record of 3–27.

Biography
Hart was the athletic director at the University of Louisville from 1973 to 1978. He also served in the same capacity at the University of Missouri from 1978 to 1986, before he was appointed as the commissioner of the Southern Conference.

Hart was a native of Connellsville, Pennsylvania. He coached high school football in Pennsylvania for eleven years before moving to the college ranks in 1962, when he became an assistant coach at the University of Kentucky. 

After two seasons at Kentucky, Hart moved to the United States Naval Academy, where he coached the defensive backfield in 1964 and 1965.

Hart died on March 14, 2009, at the age of eighty-three.

His son, Dave Hart Jr., was the vice chancellor and director of athletics at the University of Tennessee. Before, he was the executive director of athletics at his alma mater, assisting Alabama athletic director Mal Moore. Previously, he spent twelve years as Florida State's athletic director and at East Carolina University in the same role.

His grandson, Rick Hart, is the athletic director at Southern Methodist University. Rick was previously athletic director at University of Tennessee at Chattanooga.

Head coaching record

References

1925 births
2009 deaths
Kentucky Wildcats football coaches
Louisville Cardinals athletic directors
Missouri Tigers athletic directors
Navy Midshipmen football coaches
Pittsburgh Panthers football coaches
Saint Vincent Bearcats football players
Southern Conference commissioners
High school football coaches in Pennsylvania
People from Connellsville, Pennsylvania
Players of American football from Pennsylvania